Heinrich Müller (28 April 1900; date of death unknown, but evidence points to May 1945) was a high-ranking German Schutzstaffel (SS) and police official during the Nazi era. For the majority of World War II in Europe, he was the chief of the Gestapo, the secret state police of Nazi Germany. Müller was central in the planning and execution of The Holocaust and attended the January 1942 Wannsee Conference, which formalised plans for deportation and genocide of all Jews in German-occupied Europe—The "Final Solution to the Jewish Question". He was known as "Gestapo Müller" to distinguish him from another SS general named Heinrich Müller.

He was last seen in the Führerbunker in Berlin on 1 May 1945 and remains the most senior figure of the Nazi regime who was never captured or confirmed to have died.

Early life and career
Müller was born in Munich on 28 April 1900 to Catholic parents. His father had been a rural police official. Müller attended a Volksschule and completed an apprenticeship as an aircraft mechanic before the outbreak of the First World War. During the last year of the war, he served in the Luftstreitkräfte as a pilot for an artillery spotting unit. He was decorated several times for bravery (including the Iron Cross 1st and 2nd class, Bavarian Military Merit Cross 2nd Class with Swords and Bavarian Pilots Badge). After the war ended, he joined the Bavarian Police in 1919 as an auxiliary worker. Although not a member of the Freikorps, he was involved in the suppression of the communist risings in the early post-war years. After witnessing the shooting of hostages by the revolutionary "Red Army" in Munich during the Bavarian Soviet Republic, he acquired a lifelong hatred of communism. During the years of the Weimar Republic he was head of the Munich Political Police Department, having risen quickly through the ranks due to his spirited efforts.

SS career
It was under these auspices that he became acquainted with many members of the Nazi Party (NSDAP) including Heinrich Himmler and Reinhard Heydrich, although Müller in the Weimar period was generally seen as a supporter of the Bavarian People's Party (which at that time ruled Bavaria). On 9 March 1933, during the Nazi putsch that deposed the Bavarian government of Minister-President Heinrich Held, Müller advocated to his superiors using force against the Nazis. Ironically, these views aided Müller's rise as it guaranteed the hostility of the Nazis, thereby making Müller very dependent upon the patronage of Reinhard Heydrich, who in turn appreciated Müller's professionalism and skill as a policeman, and was aware of Müller's past. Once the Nazis seized power, Müller's knowledge of communist activities placed him in high demand; as a result he was promoted to Polizeiobersekretär in May 1933 and again to Criminal Inspector in November 1933.

Historian Richard J. Evans wrote: "Müller was a stickler for duty and discipline, and approached the tasks he was set as if they were military commands. A true workaholic who never took a vacation, Müller was determined to serve the German state, irrespective of what political form it took, and believed it was everyone's duty, including his own, to obey its dictates without question." Evans also records Müller was a regime functionary out of ambition, not out of a belief in National Socialism: An internal [Nazi] Party memorandum ... could not understand how "so odious an opponent of the movement" could become head of the Gestapo, especially since he had once referred to Hitler as "an immigrant unemployed house painter" and "an Austrian draft-dodger". Nazi jurist and former police chief, SS-Obergruppenführer Werner Best opined Müller represented one of the "finest examples" of the limited connection between members of the NSDAP and the police before 1933.

After the Nazis came to power in 1933, Heydrich, as head of the Security Service (SD), recruited Müller, Franz Josef Huber and Josef Albert Meisinger, who were collectively referred to as the "Bajuwaren-Brigade" (Bavarian Brigade). Müller joined the SS in 1934. By 1936, with Heydrich head of the Gestapo, Müller was its operations chief.

On 4 January 1937, an evaluation by the Nazi Party's Deputy Gauleiter of Munich-Upper Bavaria stated:

This assessment did not deter Heydrich from moving Müller along the ranks, particularly since Heydrich believed it was an advantage not to be bound to the influence of the Nazi Party. Functionaries like Müller were the sort of men Heydrich preferred since they were inherently committed to their "area of responsibility" and correspondingly justified any steps they deemed necessary against perceived enemies of the Nazi "racial community." Müller was promoted to the rank of Standartenführer (colonel) in 1937. Engrossing himself often in red-tape and statistics, Müller was a natural administrator who took solace in a "world of notes, memos, and regulations" and then received and transformed Gestapo reports of denouncements, torture, and secret executions into "administrative fodder." Despite the expense of so much mental energy in carrying out his duties, Müller disliked the scholarly types and once told Walter Schellenberg that "intellectuals should be sent down a coal mine and blown up."

British author and translator Edward Crankshaw described Müller as "the arch-type non-political functionary" who was "in love with personal power and dedicated to the service of authority, the State." General Walter Dornberger, the chief over the rocket research at Peenemünde, (under alleged Gestapo suspicion) was one of the few to ever interview with Müller and characterized him as, "the unobtrusive type of police official who leaves no personal impression on the memory" but added, "... all I could remember was a pair of piercing grey-blue eyes, fixed on me with an unwavering scrutiny. My first impression was one of cold curiosity and extreme reserve." American journalist and war correspondent, William L. Shirer, called Müller a "a dapper-looking fellow" but shortly thereafter described him as "a cold, dispassionate killer".

Himmler biographer Peter Padfield wrote: "he [Müller] was an archetypal middle rank official: of limited imagination, non-political, non-ideological, his only fanaticism lay in an inner drive to perfection in his profession and in his duty to the state—which in his mind were one ... A smallish man with piercing eyes and thin lips, he was an able organiser, utterly ruthless, a man who lived for his work." Such was his dedication to the job that Auschwitz Commandant Rudolf Höss claimed one could reach Müller "any time of the day or night, even Sundays and public holidays."

He was made Inspector of the Security Police for all of Austria following the 1938 Anschluss, while his close friend Franz Josef Huber took charge of the Gestapo office in Vienna. One of Müller's first major acts occurred during the unprecedented Kristallnacht pogrom of 9–10 November 1938, when he ordered the arrest of between 20,000 and 30,000 Jews. Heydrich also tasked Müller during the summer of 1939 to create a centrally organized agency to deal with the eventual emigration of the Jews. Müller became a member of the Nazi Party in 1939 for the purely opportunist reason of improving his chances of promotion and only after Himmler insisted he do it. Historian Robert Gellately does not give much credence to this apolitical image of Müller and cites the musings of Walter Schellenberg, who claimed during a conversation with Müller sometime in 1943, Müller lauded the Stalinist system as superior to Nazism, which he believed compromised on too much. Schellenberg even alleged when Müller compared Stalin against Hitler, his (Müller's) opinion was Stalin did things better. As Gellately relates, such a politically oriented asseveration certainly indicates Müller did indeed have preferences. He was notorious, for instance, for admiring the Soviet police.

While the chief of the subsequent Reich Central Office for Jewish Emigration was indeed Heydrich, it was Müller who took care of the office's administrative details. Shortly thereafter, Müller took charge of this office but then handed control over to Adolf Eichmann. Once the war began, this ended the possibility of Jewish emigration and caused the office's dissolution.

Gestapo chief

In September 1939, when the Gestapo and other police organizations were consolidated under Heydrich into the Reich Security Main Office (RSHA), Müller was made chief of the RSHA "Amt IV" (Office or Dept. 4): Gestapo. To distinguish him from another SS general named Heinrich Müller, he became known as "Gestapo Müller".

As Gestapo chief of operations and later (September 1939 forward) head of the organization, Müller played a leading role in the detection and suppression of all forms of resistance to the Nazi regime. Trusted by both Heydrich and Himmler, Müller was pivotal in making the Gestapo the "central executive organ of National Socialist terror" according to historians Carsten Dams and Michael Stolle. Under his leadership, the Gestapo succeeded in infiltrating and to a large extent, destroying groups opposed to the Nazis, such as the underground networks of the left-wing Social Democratic Party and Communist Party. Along these lines, historian George C. Browder asserts that Müller's "expertise and his ardent hate for Communism guaranteed his future".

When Hitler and his army chiefs asked for a pretext for the invasion of Poland in 1939, Himmler, Heydrich, and Müller masterminded and carried out a false flag project code-named Operation Himmler. During one of the operations, the clandestine mission to a German radio station on the Polish border, Müller helped collect a dozen or so condemned men from camps, who were then dressed in Polish uniforms. In exchange for their participation, the men were told by Müller that "they would be pardoned and released." Instead, the men were given a lethal injection and gunshot wounds to make them appear to have been killed in action during a fake attack. These incidents (particularly the staged attack on the Gleiwitz radio station) were then used in Nazi propaganda to justify the invasion of Poland, the opening event of World War II.

Thereafter, Müller continued to rise quickly through the ranks of the SS: in October 1939 he became an SS-Oberführer, in November 1941 – Gruppenführer and Lieutenant General of the police. During the Second World War, Müller was heavily involved in espionage and counter-espionage, particularly since the Nazi regime increasingly distrusted the military intelligence service—the Abwehr—which under Admiral Wilhelm Canaris was a hotbed of activity for the German Resistance. In 1942 he successfully infiltrated the "Red Orchestra" network of Soviet spies and used it to feed false information to the Soviet intelligence services.

Heydrich was Müller's direct superior until his assassination in 1942. For the remainder of the war, Ernst Kaltenbrunner took over as Müller's superior. Müller occupied a position in the Nazi hierarchy close to Himmler, the overall head of the Nazi police apparatus and the chief architect of the plan to exterminate the Jews of Europe, and Eichmann, the man entrusted with arranging the deportations of Jews to the Eastern ghettoes and death camps. Eichmann headed the Gestapo's "Office of Resettlement", and then its "Office of Jewish Affairs" (the RSHA Amt IV sub-section known as Referat IV B4). He was Müller's subordinate. Müller was also involved in the regime's policy towards the Jews, although Himmler and Propaganda Minister Joseph Goebbels drove this area of policy. On 6 October 1939 for instance, Müller instructed Eichmann to prepare for the deportation of some 70,000 to 80,000 Jews from the annexed Polish city of Kattowitz; an order which included the deportation of the Jews from Ostrava—both "expulsion campaigns" had already been planned as early as September by the Gestapo or the army. Twelve days later on 18 October 1939, he told Eichmann it would soon "be necessary to organize the resettlement and removal of Poles and Jews into the area of the future Polish rump state centrally" via the RSHA.

Although his chief responsibility was always police work within Germany, he was fully in charge and thus responsible to execute the extermination of the Jews of Europe. When Eichmann reported to Müller sometime in the middle of 1941 that he had been informed by Himmler the Führer had ordered the physical destruction of the Jews for instance, Müller silently nodded at his desk, indicating to Eichmann that he already knew. Correspondingly, Müller received detailed reports from Eichmann about the Einsatzgruppen death-squad units, which according to historian Raul Hilberg killed more than two million people, including 1.3 million Jews between 1941 and 1945. At the end of June 1941, Müller dispatched Eichmann to Minsk, so he could collect detailed information on the execution activities. In August 1941, Müller ordered these killing reports be forwarded to Hitler. Attempting to keep the brutality of the wholesale slaughter occurring in the East as quiet as possible, Müller sent a telegram to the Einsatzgruppen towards the end of August 1941, which explicitly instructed them "to prevent the crowding of spectators during the mass executions." On 23 October 1941, Müller briefed a circular to SiPo stations which exclusively prohibited any future Jewish emigration out of German controlled territory, a directive which presaged their imminent extermination.

In January 1942, he attended the Wannsee Conference at which Heydrich briefed senior officials from a number of government departments of the extermination plan, and at which Eichmann took the minutes. Once the conference concluded, Müller, Heydrich, and Eichmann remained afterwards for additional "informal chats". Just a couple months later in March 1942, Jews were already being systematically killed in gas vans at Chelmno and Belzec while construction was underway at Birkenau and Sobibor. Again, Müller sent Eichmann to relate his findings about the killing operations taking place at Chelmno; when Eichmann returned this time, he reported to Müller that the scene was "horrible" and added it was "an indescribable inferno." When the first denunciations of the mass murder being carried-out by the Germans hit the Allied press during the autumn and winter of 1942, Himmler instructed Müller to ensure "all the bodies were either buried or burned."

Enforcement and administration of Nazi "racial-hygiene" policies were also within the purview of Müller's responsibilities, as a special letter he sent from Berlin to all Gestapo offices on 10 March 1942 reveals; the letter contained instructions concerning the relationship between German women and Polish civilians or prisoners-of-war who were conscripted as labor during the war, particularly in cases related to pregnancy. If both parties proved "racially acceptable" and the Polish man wanted to marry the woman, the pregnancy and relationship was allowed without punitive consequences, provided the RSHA approved after photographic evaluation of both parties and subsequent "Germanization" of the Pole occurred. For cases where one or more parties was deemed racially unfit, the Polish male would receive "special handling", an obvious Nazi euphemism for a death-sentence.

In May 1942, Heydrich was assassinated in Prague by Czechoslovak soldiers sent from London. Müller was sent to Prague to head the investigation into Operation "Anthropoid". He succeeded through a combination of bribery and torture in locating the assassins, who killed themselves to avoid capture. Despite this success, his influence within the regime declined somewhat with the loss of his original patron, Heydrich. Nonetheless, between the time Heydrich died in 1942 and Kaltenbrunner took office in January 1943, "Müller played a central role in the organization of The Holocaust." Evidence of Müller's intimate involvement in the Holocaust are abundant in some of the surviving documents and in the later testimony of Eichmann, who divulged that he remained in constant contact with Müller. Eichmann recalled how Müller reserved power unto himself and while he (Eichmann), arranged plenty of deportations, it was only Müller who could write the total number of Jews (in his orange-colored pencil) who were transported at the top of the corresponding reports.

As the Red Army counteroffensive against the Germans arrayed at the Battle of Stalingrad in mid-November 1942 started to take its toll, the exigencies of war demanded an increase in arms production; Müller played his part by responding to and facilitating Himmler's request for an additional 35,000–40,000 forced laborers. The Gestapo Chief rounded them up from across detention centers and prisons which were not yet part of the concentration camp system and sent them to Majdanek and Auschwitz. Sometime in 1943, Müller was sent to Rome to pressure Fascist Italy to cooperate in relinquishing their Jews for deportation. Despite having the apparent support of Benito Mussolini, Müller's efforts were not very successful as influential Jewish figures within Italy were in contact with the police and the military; they successfully appealed to their (Italians and Jews) shared religious convictions and convinced them to resist Nazi pressure. In 1943 Müller had differences with Himmler over what to do with the growing evidence of a resistance network within the German state apparatus, particularly the Abwehr and the Foreign Office. He presented Himmler with firm evidence during February 1943, that Wilhelm Canaris was involved with the resistance; however, Himmler told him to drop the case. Offended by this, Müller became an ally of Martin Bormann, the head of the Nazi Party Chancellery, who was Himmler's main rival.

According to the SiPo and SD official in Denmark, Rudolf Mildner, Gestapo Chief Müller instructed him "to arrest the Nobel Prize–winning atomic physicist Niels Bohr" sometime during the fall of 1943; this was likely the consequence of Bohr being half-Jewish, but his scientific significance also interested officials in Berlin. Fortunately for Bohr, he was tipped off by a sympathetic German woman working for the Gestapo and was able to escape across the Kattegat Strait into Sweden with the evacuation of Jews from Denmark. Later, Mildner conveniently asserted during Allied questioning that he had disobeyed Müller's order and allowed Bohr to get to safety.

Early in 1944, Müller issued the Nazi injunction known as the "cartridge directive"; this command ordered that Soviet prisoners-of-war who had assisted in the identification of detained political commissars for the purpose of their liquidation be executed on the grounds they were Geheimnisträger (bearers of secrets). Instructions like these amid the numerous other crimes committed at his command made Müller "one of the most feared officials in Europe" during the Nazi reign.

After the assassination attempt against Adolf Hitler on 20 July 1944, Müller was placed in charge of the arrest and interrogation of all those suspected of involvement in the resistance. Over 5,000 people were arrested and about 200 executed, including Canaris. Not long after the anti-Nazi resisters were  killed, Müller allegedly exclaimed, "We won't make the same mistake as in 1918. We won't leave our internal German enemies alive." In the last months of the war, Müller remained at his post, apparently still confident of a German victory: he told one of his officers in December 1944 that the Ardennes offensive would result in the recapture of Paris.

Berlin 1945
In April 1945, he was among the last group of Nazi loyalists assembled in the Führerbunker in central Berlin as the Red Army fought its way into the city in the Battle of Berlin. One of his last tasks was the sharp interrogation of Hermann Fegelein in the cellar of the Church of the Trinity as to what he knew of Himmler's attempted peace negotiations with the Western allies behind Hitler's back. Fegelein was Himmler's SS liaison officer and was shot after Hitler had Himmler expelled from all his posts for the betrayal. Hitler's secretary, Traudl Junge, recounted seeing Müller on 22 April 1945 and claimed she saw him on occasion chatting with Hitler in the bunker; she also added that Müller had assumed Kaltenbrunner's former duties as head of the RSHA. Both Junge and Oberscharführer Rochus Misch, the telephone operator for the Führerbunker, recalled seeing Müller on 30 April 1945. Misch placed him in the Reich Chancellery still in full uniform. That afternoon, Hitler committed suicide. On 2 May 1945, the commander of the Berlin Defence Area, General Helmuth Weidling, surrendered to the Red Army.

Disappearance
Müller was last seen in the bunker on the evening of 1 May 1945, the day after Hitler's suicide. Hans Baur, Hitler's pilot, later quoted Müller as saying; "we know the Russian methods exactly. I haven't the faintest intention of being taken prisoner by the Russians". From that day onwards, no trace of him has ever been found. He is the most senior member of the Nazi government whose fate remains a mystery. However, the best evidence points to him either having been killed or committing suicide during the chaos of the fall of Berlin in 1945, and his body, if recovered, was not identified.

The Central Intelligence Agency's (CIA) file on Müller was released under the Freedom of Information Act in 2001, and documents several unsuccessful attempts by U.S. agencies to find Müller. The U.S. National Archives commentary on the file concludes: "Though inconclusive on Müller's ultimate fate, the file is very clear on one point. The Central Intelligence Agency and its predecessors did not know Müller's whereabouts at any point after the war. In other words, the CIA was never in contact with Müller." The CIA file shows an extensive search was made for Müller in the months after the German surrender. The search was led by the counterespionage branch of the U.S. Office of Strategic Services (forerunner of the CIA). The search was complicated by the fact that "Heinrich Müller" is a very common German name. A further problem arose because "some of these Müllers, including Gestapo Müller, did not appear to have middle names. An additional source of confusion was that there were two different SS generals named Heinrich Müller".

In 1947, American and British agents searched the home of his wartime mistress Anna Schmid, but found nothing suggesting that he was still alive. With the onset of the Cold War and the shift of priorities to meeting the challenge of the Soviet Union, interest in pursuing missing Nazis declined. By this time, the conclusion seems to have been reached that Müller was most likely dead. The Royal Air Force Special Investigation Branch also had an interest in Müller with regard to the Stalag Luft III murders, for which he was presumed to have responsibility given his position in the Gestapo.

Walter Schellenberg alleged in his memoir that Müller had defected to the Soviets in 1945. Schellenberg also wrote that a German officer—who had been a prisoner of war in Russia—claimed to have seen Müller in Moscow in 1948, and that he had died shortly afterward. There is no reference in the memoir as to who the German officer was or any other details that might help verify this claim.

The seizure in 1960 and subsequent trial in Israel of Adolf Eichmann sparked new interest in Müller's whereabouts. Although Eichmann revealed no specific information, he told his Israeli interrogators that he believed that Müller was still alive. The West German office in charge of the prosecution of war criminals charged the police to investigate. The possibility that Müller was working for the Soviet Union was considered, but no definite information was gained. Müller's family and his former secretary were placed under surveillance by the Allies in case he was corresponding with them.

The West Germans investigated several reports of Müller's body being found and buried in the days after the fall of Berlin. The reports were contradictory, not wholly reliable and it was not possible to confirm any of them. One such report came from Walter Lüders, a former member of the Volkssturm, who said he had been part of a burial unit which had found the body of an SS general in the garden of the Reich Chancellery, with the identity papers of Heinrich Müller. The body had been buried in a mass grave at the old Jewish Cemetery on Grosse Hamburger Strasse in the Soviet Sector. Since this location was in East Berlin in 1961, this gravesite could not at the time be investigated by West Germany, nor has there been any attempt to excavate this gravesite since the reunification of Germany.

In 1961, Lieutenant-Colonel Michael Goleniewski, the Deputy Chief of Polish Military Counter Intelligence, defected to the United States. Goleniewski had worked as an interrogator of captured German officials from 1948 to 1952. He never met Müller, but said he had heard from his Soviet supervisors that sometime between 1950 and 1952, the Soviets had "picked up Müller and taken him to Moscow". The CIA tried to track down the men Goleniewski named as having worked with Müller in Moscow, but were unable to confirm his story. Israel also continued to pursue Müller: in 1967, two Israeli operatives were caught by West German police attempting to break into the Munich apartment of Müller's wife.

In 1967, in Panama City, a man named Francis Willard Keith was accused of being Müller. West German diplomats pressed Panama to extradite him for trial. West German prosecutors said Sophie Müller, 64, had seen photos of Keith and identified him as her long-missing husband. However, Keith was released once fingerprints proved he was not Müller.

The CIA investigation concluded: "There is little room for doubt that the Soviet and Czechoslovak [intelligence] services circulated rumors to the effect that Müller had escaped to the West ... to offset the charges that the Soviets had sheltered the criminal ... There are strong indications but no proof that Müller collaborated with [the Soviets]. There are also strong indications but no proof that Müller died [in Berlin]." The CIA apparently remained convinced at that time that if Müller had survived the war, he was being harboured within the Soviet Union. But when the Soviet Union collapsed in 1991 and the Soviet archives were opened, no evidence to support this belief emerged. The U.S. National Archives commentary concludes: "More information about Müller's fate might still emerge from still secret files of the former Soviet Union. The CIA file, by itself, does not permit definitive conclusions. Taking into account the currently available records, the authors of this report conclude that Müller most likely died in Berlin in early May 1945." By the 1990s, it was in any case increasingly unlikely Müller, who was born in 1900, would be alive even if he had survived the war.

In 2008, German historian Peter Longerich published a biography of Heinrich Himmler—translated into English in 2012—that contained an unsubstantiated account of Müller's last known whereabouts. According to reports from Himmler's adjutant Werner Grothmann, Müller was with Himmler at Flensburg on 11 May 1945 and accompanied Himmler and other SS officers as they attempted to escape the Allies on foot. Himmler and Müller parted company at Meinstedt, after which Müller was not seen again. 

In 2013, Johannes Tuchel, the head of the Memorial to the German Resistance, claimed Müller's body was found in August 1945 by a work crew cleaning up corpses and was one of 3,000 buried in a mass grave on the site of a former Jewish cemetery in Berlin-Mitte. While Tuchel was confident he had solved the mystery, whether Müller is actually there has not been confirmed. Nonetheless, the uncertainty of Müller's ultimate end and/or whereabouts has only served to nourish the "mysterious power" that the Gestapo elicits even to the present.

Alleged CIC dossier 
In July 1988, author Ian Sayer received from an anonymous individual a 427-page document, which claimed to be a photocopy of a US Army Counter Intelligence Corps (CIC) file that had been inadvertently released by the US National Archives. The dossier purported to confirm Heinrich Müller had survived the war and been retained by the CIC as an intelligence adviser.

Sayer and co-author Douglas Botting were known to be working on a comprehensive history of the CIC at that time. The alleged dossier had also come to the attention of the US Department of Justice's Nazi-hunting unit, the Office of Special Investigations, who subsequently sought Sayer's opinion on the veracity of the documents. By this time the anonymous individual (later identified as Gregory Douglas) had managed to interest Time magazine and the London Times newspaper in his story. The claims of the dossier, which include a conspiracy theory about Hitler's death (involving a body double) are considered by historians such as Anton Joachimsthaler and Luke Daly-Groves as an example of created "myths".

See also

 Glossary of Nazi Germany
 List of Nazi Party leaders and officials
 List of fugitives from justice who disappeared
 List of SS personnel

References
Informational notes

Citations

Bibliography

External links
Nazi War Crimes and Japanese Imperial Government Records Interagency Working Group: RG 263 Detailed Report, Heinrich Mueller

1900 births
Christian fascists
Date of death unknown
Fugitives
Fugitives wanted by Germany
German anti-communists
Luftstreitkräfte personnel
German Roman Catholics
German World War I pilots
Gestapo personnel
Holocaust perpetrators
Military personnel from Munich
People from the Kingdom of Bavaria
Police misconduct in Germany
Reich Security Main Office personnel
Recipients of the clasp to the Iron Cross, 1st class
Recipients of the Knights Cross of the War Merit Cross
Romani genocide perpetrators
SS and Police Leaders
SS-Gruppenführer
Missing person cases in Germany